As Sure As The Stars is the fourth album released by onehundredhours on the Survivor Records label. It was released on 20 July 2007.  Many of the tracks were first played to audiences who attended the New Wine and Soul Survivor festivals in the following weeks.

Track list
Home (2:51)
Almost There (2:50)
Forever Over Us (4:11)
Mercy Day (3:30)
Hold On (3:52)
Love Rescue Me (4:10)
Remember (3:46)
Come As You Are (3:36)
I Can't See Myself (2:29)
She (3:20)
Safe In Your Hands (4:16)
Love Come Take Me Home (5:32)

Onehundredhours albums
2007 albums